Taizihe District is a district of the city of Liaoyang, Liaoning province, People's Republic of China.

Administrative divisions
There are two subdistricts, one town, and one township within the district.

Subdistricts:
Wangshuitai Subdistrict, Xinhua Subdistrict

The only town is Qijia

Townships:
Dongningwei Township, Dongjingling Township

References

External links

County-level divisions of Liaoning
Liaoyang